Antonio Rocco Romeo (born March 25, 2000) is a Canadian professional soccer player who plays as a centre-back for Vancouver FC.

Early life
Born in Toronto, Ontario, Romeo began playing youth soccer with Bolton Wanderers SC, before moving on to the Woodbridge Strikers.

Club career
In 2014, Romeo joined the Toronto FC youth system. He played 17 games for Toronto FC III in League1 Ontario during the 2016 season and 15 games during the 2017 season, scoring once against Toronto Skillz FC.

On September 4, 2016, Romeo made his debut for Toronto FC II, the reserve team of Toronto FC, in the United Soccer League against Charlotte Independence. He came on as a 62nd minute substitute for Clément Simonin as Toronto FC II lost 5–1. On September 15, 2017, Romeo signed his first professional contract, joining Toronto FC II on a permanent basis. On January 31, 2019, Danish 1st Division club HB Køge announced that they had signed Romeo on a loan deal until June 30.

On January 21, 2020, Romeo signed a first-team MLS deal with Toronto FC. On August 13, HB Køge announced Romeo had returned to the club once again on loan. He scored his first goal for Køge on October 6 in a cup match against Bispebjerg BK, also picking up a red card later in the same match.

On July 30, 2021, he was loaned to Valour FC of the Canadian Premier League. The next day he made his debut for Valour against FC Edmonton. In the next match on August 4, he scored his first goal for Valour against Pacific FC. Upon completion of the 2021 season, Romeo's option for the 2022 season was not picked up by Toronto, making him a free agent.

In February 2022, Romeo signed with Valour FC on a permanent deal.

Following the expiration of his contract with Valour, on January 16, 2023, Romeo joined newly-constituted side Vancouver FC on a free transfer.

International career
Romeo has represented Canada at the 2017 CONCACAF U-17 Championship. On October 24, 2018, he was named to the Canadian U20 squad for the 2018 CONCACAF U-20 Championship. Romeo was named to the Canadian U-23 provisional roster for the 2020 CONCACAF Men's Olympic Qualifying Championship on February 26, 2020, however, the tournament was soon after postponed indefinitely due to the COVID-19 pandemic.

Career statistics

Honours
Toronto FC III
League1 Ontario Second Team All Star: 2016, 2017

References

External links 
 Toronto FC Profile
 

2000 births
Living people
Association football defenders
Canadian soccer players
Soccer players from Toronto
Homegrown Players (MLS)
Canadian expatriate soccer players
Canadian expatriate sportspeople in Denmark
Expatriate men's footballers in Denmark
Toronto FC II players
Toronto FC players
HB Køge players
Valour FC players
Vancouver FC players
Danish 1st Division players
League1 Ontario players
USL Championship players
Canadian Premier League players
Canada men's youth international soccer players